The Wulaokeng Scenic Area is a park in Su'ao Township, Yilan County, Taiwan.

Geology
The park spreads across 400 hectares of area and is bounded by the Xincheng River on its east. It features camping ground and barbecue area.

Transportation
The park is accessible within walking distance west of Xinma Station of Taiwan Railways.

See also
 List of tourist attractions in Taiwan

References

External links

 

Geography of Yilan County, Taiwan
Parks in Yilan County